Milda cincta, common name the banded pyram, is a species of sea snail, a marine gastropod mollusk in the family Pyramidellidae, the pyrams and their allies.

Description
The shell is smooth, white, with a broad central chestnut zone, appearing on the spire whorls. Its length varies between 15 mm and 33 mm. The columella is triplicatewith a narrow perforation.

Distribution
This marine species occurs off Vietnam, the Philippines and Australia.

References

External links
 To World Register of Marine Species
 

Pyramidellidae
Gastropods described in 1842